KKVM (104.7 FM) is a radio station broadcasting an album adult alternative format. Licensed to Vail, Colorado, United States, the station is currently owned by Steve Leigh through licensee KNS Broadcasting, LLC.

History
The station was assigned the call letters KSKE on 1989-12-21. On 1990-01-29, the station changed its call sign to KSKE-FM. On 2009-09-08, the station changed its call sign to KBTB, and on 2011-04-26 to the current KKVM.

In 2011, the station call letters were changed to KKVM.  The Mile was named after the popular background ski trail "the Mile" between Vail Mountain and Minturn, Colorado. KKVM subsequently went through numerous ownership and format changes before its current incarnation of playing Classic Hits.

The Mile is an affiliate of the syndicated Pink Floyd program "Floydian Slip."

KKVM-FM "The Mile"

References

External links
 

KVM